Cliff Inglis (1 January 1935 – 1 January 2001) was an English professional darts player. His prime years were in the mid-1970s and 1980s. Inglis was the winner of the first World Masters tournament, still considered by many as the most prestigious darts competition. He was nicknamed Ticker during his career.

Career
In 1974, Inglis won the inaugural Phonogram World Masters, defeating Harry Heenan 3–2 in the final. The following year he was a Unicorn World Darts Championship finalist, and was runner-up in the Indoor League – which was televised by Yorkshire TV - to Conrad Daniels. For two successive years in the mid-1970s, he won the Man of the Match award playing for England in the Home Internationals.

On 11 November 1975, at the Broomfield Working Men's Club in Devon, England, Inglis entered the Guinness Book of Records by throwing a 19-dart 1001 game. Inglis averaged 52.68 points per dart.

Inglis quit the BDO in 1981 and retired shortly thereafter. He died on 1 January 2001, at his 66th birthday.

Career finals

BDO major finals: 1 (1 title)

External links
 Profile and stats on Darts Database
 Profile and stats on Darts Mad

1935 births
2001 deaths
English darts players
British Darts Organisation players